The Airports Authority of India, or AAI, is a public sector enterprise under the ownership of the Ministry of Civil Aviation, Government of India. It is responsible for creating, upgrading, maintaining, and managing civil aviation infrastructure in India. It provides Communication Navigation Surveillance/Air Traffic Management (CNS/ATM) services over the Indian airspace and adjoining oceanic areas. AAI currently manages a total of 137 airports, including 34 international airports, 10 Customs Airports, 81 domestic airports, and 23 Civil enclaves at Defence airfields. AAI also has ground installations at all airports and 25 other locations to ensure the safety of aircraft operations. AAI covers all major air routes over the Indian landmass via 29 Radar installations at 11 locations along with 700 VOR/DVOR installations co-located with Distance Measuring Equipment (DME). 52 runways are provided with Instrument landing system (ILS) installations with Night Landing Facilities at most of these airports and an Automatic Message Switching System at 15 Airports.

History
The Government of India constituted the International Airports Authority of India (IAAI) in 1972 to manage the nation's international airports while the National Airports Authority of India (NAAI) was constituted in 1986 to look after domestic airports. The organizations were merged in April 1995 by an Act of Parliament, namely, the Airports Authority of India Act, 1994 and has been constituted as a Statutory Body and was named as Airports Authority of India (AAI). This new organisation was to be responsible for creating, upgrading, maintaining and managing civil aviation infrastructure both on the ground and air space in the country.

Major ongoing projects 
AAI's implementation of the Automatic Dependence Surveillance System (ADSS) at Kolkata and Chennai Air Traffic Control Centers, made India the first country to use this technology in the Southeast Asian region thus enabling Air Traffic Control over oceanic areas using satellite mode of communication. Performance Based Navigation (PBN) procedures have already been implemented at Mumbai, Delhi and Ahmedabad Airports. AAI is implementing the GAGAN project in technological collaboration with the Indian Space Research Organization (ISRO). The navigation signals thus received from the GPS will be augmented to achieve the navigational requirement of aircraft. The first phase of the technology demonstration system was completed in February 2008.

Organizational structure 
AAI board consists of a Chairman and five whole time members which are appointed by the central government. Director General of Civil Aviation is an ex-officio member of AAI board. Apart from this, AAI board also has part-time members. AAI is divided into five administrative regions, each headed by a Regional Executive Director (RED).
AAI having its corporate headquarters at Rajiv Gandhi Bhawan, New Delhi is operating from its five regional headquarters namely-

 Eastern Regional Headquarter at Kolkata, West Bengal
 Western Regional Headquarter at Mumbai, Maharashtra
 Northern Regional Headquarter at Delhi, NCR
 Southern Regional Headquarter at Chennai, Tamil Nadu
 North-Eastern Regional Headquarter at Guwahati, Assam.

AAI has five training establishments, including three ATS training organizations (ATSTO) viz.

 The Civil Aviation Training College (CATC) at Prayagraj, Uttar Pradesh.
 Hyderabad Training Center (HTC) at Hyderabad, Telangana.
 National Institute of Aviation Training and Management (NIATAM) at Gondia, Maharashtra. 
 Indian Aviation Academy (National Institute of Aviation Management and Research (NIAMAR) at Delhi (a joint venture of Airports Authority of India, Directorate General of Civil Aviation (India) and Bureau of Civil Aviation Security, Govt of India) and
 Fire Training Centres (FTC) at Delhi & Kolkata.

An Aerodrome Visual Simulator (AVS) has been provided at CATC and non-radar procedural ATC simulator equipment is being supplied to CATC Allahabad and Hyderabad Airport. AAI has a dedicated Flight Inspection Unit (FIU) with a fleet of three aircraft fitted with a flight inspection system to inspect Instrument Landing Systems up to Cat-III, VORs, DMEs, NDBs, VGSI (PAPI, VASI) and RADAR (ASR/MSSR). In addition to in-house flight calibration of its navigational aids, AAI undertakes flight calibration of navigational aids for the Indian Air Force, Indian Navy, Indian Coast Guard and other private airfields in the country.

Eastern region 
The Eastern region of AAI controls 20 airports (including 12 non-operational airports) and four aeronautical communications stations. Eastern regional headquarters located in Kolkata, West Bengal, coordinates and controls the entire activities of all the airports and aeronautical communication stations listed below.

 The Regional Executive Director (RED) of the Airports Authority of India is the Executive Head of the Eastern Region. He is the overall in charge of all activities (Operations, Security, Commercial, Safety, Finance & Administration) of the Eastern Region of the Airports Authority of India. The Eastern Region of the Airports Authority of India is presently headed by Sh. Manoj Gangal, Regional Executive Director.

Functions & responsibilities of Eastern regional departments of AAI

Communication, navigation and surveillance 

 Among the FIRs (Flight Information Regions) in Indian Airspace, almost one-third of the entire Airspace is controlled/ managed by Kolkata ACC. The responsibility of providing ANS (CNS/ATM) infrastructure for this huge Airspace is undertaken by CNS, Kolkata with installations at Remote stations located in the Eastern & North- East Region and beyond. In fact, with active persuasion from CNS, Kolkata ADS-B data from COCO Islands & SITTWE in Myanmar is now integrated with the Kolkata Automation system.

The ANS infrastructure and data/voice connectivity (i.e. Communication, Navigation, Surveillance and Automation) to manage this coverage is provided and maintained by CNS, Kolkata.

Facilities provided by CNS Kolkata

 VHF/VCS
 Navaids
 Surveillance:
 Automation
 HF transmitter & receiver & HRFT
 CNS stores
 Upper airspace harmonization
 Single continuum upper airspace in Kolkata
 Integration of surveillance data & VHF in ATS automation system
 Seamless surveillance coverage over Kolkata FIR
 Seamless vhf coverage over Kolkata FIR
 VHF coverage
 MPLS cloud architecture
 Advanced surface movement guidance control system (ASMGCS)
 Upgradation to CAT-iiib ILS with augmented ASMGCS facility

Aviation safety 
The Aviation Safety Directorate in the region takes care of many responsibilities which are essential for the functionality of the Airports. Like it performs safety audits of all eastern region airports including RCS airports and CNS vital installation stations and monitoring of all AVS-ER audit observations. It also conducts yearly Safety Management System (SMS) training and provides assistants to all field stations to conduct safety assessments of different projects whenever required. Apart from this, the Aviation Safety Directorate also conducts the quarterly Regional Safety Committee meeting, and yearly aviation safety week and is responsible for the vetting of safety assessment documents of all Eastern Region Airports among others.

Operations 

Operations Department consists of:

Management of Air-side, Terminal/City side, Slot Allocation & Airport Operations Control Centre (AOCC), Public Grievances, RTI and Quality Management Issues

Functions of the Operations Department include:

To ensure serviceability of all operational/Passenger Facilities at all the times at AAl Airports

Airside Management at all AAl Airports

Terminal Management of all AAl Airports

Commissioning and operationalization of AOCC at AAl Airports

Safety Management and coordination with all AAl Airports

Plan and project the requirements regarding construction/up-gradation of the aerodrome and related facilities for safe aircraft operations

To advise and assist top management in framing corporate policies on Terminal Management of all AAl airports.

Monitoring implementation of ICAO standards and recommended practices (SARP's), and Civil Aviation Regulations (CAR's) formulated by Director General Civil Aviation (DGCA) for Aerodrome Operations and Airport Management.

Coordinate with DGCA for safety assessment on the planning, construction& commissioning of changes to airport infrastructure, and maintenance programs.

Liaise at the apex level with the various ministries, regulatory bodies like DGCA and Bureau of Civil Aviation Security (BCAS), and Immigration and Customs on issues related to Airport Management (Operations) and Aviation Security.

Allocating night parking stands to domestic flight operators at AAl Airports.

Drafting and issuance of Operational Circulars and Operational Instructions.

Monitoring the implementation of recommendations made by various courts of enquiries in respect of aircraft incidents/accidents.

Slot Management-Slot allocation for all the airlines operating domestic/ international flights.

Coordinate with Dept. of Engg. / Planning/ lT/ Security w.r.t. all planned/ modification / repair works in the terminals.

Preparation of guidelines for MESS / ESS contracts.

Comprehensive/third party liability insurance coverage for all assets at the airports.

Finalizing training programmes for staff and officers of the Operations Department in coordination with Indian Aviation Academy (IAA).

Handling of VVIP / VIP Movements and aircraft emergencies.

Engineering 
For any association Engineering Department is the spine that plane and executes different common and electrical attempts to give the infrastructural offices required. Here in the eastern Region Engineering Department does likewise for ATC/NAV-AIDS according to the necessity alongside legitimate checking and control of development and upkeep of runways/Taxiways/Apron and different structures and workplaces according to the prerequisite. At present work on the 51.4m-high ATC tower and 33.2-m key position in addition to a five-level specialized block at NSCBI Airport, Kolkata is under development. The ATS complex will be a 4-star Griha evaluated green structure right from the development stage. Notwithstanding green practices like water reaping and a decrease in power load from 9,200 kW to 4,800 kW, the structure will likewise have 31,000sqft green region. While the pinnacle tallness will increment from 34m to 51.4m, the floor region of the complicated will go up from 75,500sqm to 2,84,000sqm. The specialized square will house around 750 individuals, for the most part, regulators and designers. Likewise, there will be an office to leave 200 vehicles and 100 bikes.

Fire 
The principal objective of Airport Rescue and Fire Services is to “Save lives in the event of an aircraft accident or incident” occurring at, or near, an airport.

The Rescue and Fire Services are provided to create and maintain survivable conditions, to provide egress routes for occupants and initiate the rescue of those occupants unable to make their escape without direct aid. This also applies to any other incident where life and property can be saved. The safety of the passengers is paramount at airports run by the Airports Authority of India. AAI's highly trained Rescue and Fire Services stand ready to provide rescue and fire protection at all times.

There is an airport emergency plan to coordinate the efforts of mutual aid agencies within the airport and its immediate vicinity. The Rescue and Fire Services is responsible for managing the Airport Emergency Plan and deal the situation accordingly at the aircraft accident or incident as well as safety of the occupants and avoidance of the fire risks in the terminal building & other vital installations at the airport.

Maintain the level of Fire protection at airports, Fire prevention & Fire Protection at the Terminal & Related buildings and Vital Installation, Fire Service Personnel & Equipment and monitor the performance & ensure compliance by necessary remedial measures wherever required.

Corporate communications department 
The department deals with print and electronic media and is responsible for the media briefing, arranging press conferences, analysis of media reports, managing the social media accounts, NlTs, publishing of in-house Journals of AAI and also deals with matters concerning AAl's branding. The Corporate Communication (CC) Department deals with the allocation of Media for AAl's Advertisements through the empanelled Agencies while maintaining the implementation of Raj Bhasha Guidelines applicable in this regard. CC Department also deals with matters concerning Sponsorships, Exhibitions, Seminars etc. within the preamble of CC Policy.

ATM Directorate (ER) 
Operations include Air Traffic Services (like Air Traffic Control, Landing & Takeoff, en route flying, search and rescue services, aeronautical information services etc.), Communication, and Navigation & Surveillance (CNS). This also includes Aviation Security Services, Fire Services at airports and Passenger Facilitation in Airport Terminals.

Traffic statistics of various active airports of the eastern region.

Flying clubs / casual operators

Air traffic services

The Air Traffic Services consist of the following services:

a. Air Traffic Control Services: The Air Traffic Control Services i.e. Aerodrome Control, Surface Movement Control, Approach Control at terminal airports and Area Control Center are provided by personnel stationed in the concerned Air Traffic Control positions of the respective airports and on designated frequencies. The terminal airports operate in coordination with the Area Control Center in Kolkata. The communication with the Aircraft is mostly through two-way VHF R/T and a supplementary cover is provided by CPDLC, H/F and AFTN network.  The Area Control centre provides the Area Control Service, Flight Information Service and the Alerting Service. The Area Control centres are connected to the terminal airports and adjacent Area Control Centers by Direct Speech Circuits. Area Control Center receives feed from 11 radars (ARSR/MSSR) with a range of 250 nautical miles and 9 ADS-B Ground Stations covering the entire continental airspace and portion of Oceanic airspace (the portion of Bay of Bengal) under its jurisdiction. The major routes transiting through the FIR are R460, L759, A465, A791, G450, R581, R325, R344, L507, P646, M770, M773, N895, G472, L301, L510, N877, L524, M875 and P628.

Netaji Subhash Chandra Bose International Airport, Kolkata is equipped with an ELDIS ASR/MSSR and INDRA MSSR with a range of 250 nautical miles and an automated ATC system developed by INDRA. Specially designed standard procedures like SIDS and STARS are used to complement laid down ATS routes. To cope with the periods of very low visibility due to fog, special ILS CAT III (B) equipment is installed at NSCBI Airport, Kolkata. The automation of ATS facilities are at Biju Patnaik Airport, Bhubaneswar, Birsa Munda Airport, Ranchi, Jai Prakash Narayan International Airport, Patna, Swami Vivekananda Airport, Raipur and Gaya airports also. Other operational active Airports in the Eastern Region are Jharsuguda, Kazi Nazrul Islam Airport, Durgapur (Bengal Aerotropolis Projects Limited), Pakyong, Cooch Behar, Port Blair (Civil Enclave), Darbhanga (Civil Enclave) and Bagdogra (Civil Enclave).

b. Flight Information Service: The Aircraft operating beyond the radar coverage and outside the control areas are provided with flight information service and advisory service by the Area Control Centres. The Nodal Centre of NOTAM is also at NSCBI Airport, Kolkata.

c. Alerting Service (Search and Rescue): All the airports are established alerting posts and the specific Alerting Services are provided by the concerned Area Control centres. For this purpose close liaison is maintained with agencies like INMCC, THE INDIAN AIR FORCE and the adjacent Search and Rescue coordination centres. The distress signals picked by SARSAT and COSPAS are linked to the Indian Space Research Organization (ISRO).

'd. Aeronautical Information Services

Commercial Department

The department deals with providing various facilities for the passengers such as Retail, F&B, Duty-Free, Money Exchange, Car Rental, Vehicle Parking etc.

References 

India
Companies based in New Delhi
Indian companies established in 1995
Aviation authorities
Government agencies established in 1995
Ministry of Civil Aviation (India)
Air navigation service providers
1995 establishments in Delhi